Buczkowice  is a village in Bielsko County, Silesian Voivodeship, in southern Poland. It is the seat of the gmina (administrative district) called Gmina Buczkowice.

The village has a population of 4,102.

References

Villages in Bielsko County
Kingdom of Galicia and Lodomeria
Kraków Voivodeship (1919–1939)